The Fleetwings Sea Bird (or Seabird) was an American-built amphibious aircraft of the 1930s.

Design and production
The Sea Bird was an amphibious utility aircraft designed under contract in 1934–1935 by James C. Reddig for Fleetwings, Inc., of Bristol, Pennsylvania. While the aircraft's basic configuration had a precedent in the design of the Loening "Monoduck" developed by the Grover Loening Aircraft Company as a personal aircraft for Mr. Loening (for whom Reddig worked from 1925 to 1933), the Sea Bird was unusual because of its construction from spot-welded stainless steel. It was a high-wing, wire-braced monoplane with its engine housed in a nacelle mounted above the wings on struts. The pilot and passengers sat in a fully enclosed cabin. Fleetwings initially planned to manufacture 50 production units, but at a price approaching $25,000 during the Depression, there proved to be no sustainable market.

Operational history
The Sea Bird found use with private pilot owners and saw service with the oil support industry in Louisiana, including operation by J. Ray McDermott & Co.

Variants
 F-4 Sea Bird - 4-seat prototype (1 built)
 F-5 Sea Bird - 5-seat production aircraft (5 built)

Specifications

References

 
 
 aerofiles.com

External links

 Vintage film of the Fleetwings Sea Bird

1930s United States civil utility aircraft
Sea Bird
Amphibious aircraft
Single-engined tractor aircraft
High-wing aircraft
Aircraft first flown in 1936